Peverett is a surname. Notable people with the surname include:

Dave Peverett (1943–2000), English singer and musician
Robin Peverett, English sex offender

English-language surnames